Walcote may refer to more than one place
Walcote, Leicestershire
Walcote, Warwickshire

See also
Walcot (disambiguation)
Walcott (disambiguation)